Anne Dorthe Tanderup (born April 24, 1972) is a former Danish team handball player, Olympic champion and World Champion.

Career 
Tanderup's career as a handball player commenced when joining Brabrand IF's youth team. Shortly after being drafted to the senior team, she had a stint with the long-reigning champion of the Austrian league Hypobank Samsung (later renamed to Hypo Niederösterreich) where she won the league championship as well as the Champions League. After one season, she returned to Denmark, where she spent the rest of her career at Viborg HK. While at Viborg HK, the team won the Danish Championship four times in a row, became three-times Danish Cup winner and won the EHF Cup in 1994. In 1997 she managed to reach the Champions League finals with Viborg HK, but the team lost to Mar Valencia.

Tanderup received a gold medal at the 1996 Summer Olympics with the Danish national team, became World Champion at the 1997 World Championship and is a two-times European Champion.

During her sports career, Tanderup struggled with several injuries to her knee. Eventually, 25 years of age, her handball career came to an abrupt end at the 1997 World Championship, when she suffered a fatal knee injury causing chronic pain ever since.

Private life 
After several years out of public view, she started studying nutrition in 2008 and works as a nutritionist now. In her book “Min vej til et sundt liv” (Danish: “My way to a healthy life”) published in 2013, she describes the shift in focus in her life following the end of her sports career.

She is married to former professional Danish road bicycle racer and Tour de France winner Bjarne Riis whom she met at the 1996 Summer Olympics. Together with their four sons, the couple lives in Lugano, Switzerland.

References

External links
 Anne Dorthe Tanderup at Damehåndbolddatabasen (in Danish)
 Anne Dorthe Tanderup at the European Handball Federation's database
 

1972 births
Living people
Danish female handball players
Olympic gold medalists for Denmark
Handball players at the 1996 Summer Olympics
Sportspeople from Aarhus
Viborg HK players
Olympic medalists in handball
Medalists at the 1996 Summer Olympics